Golden Bay Air Limited is a small airline based at Tākaka Aerodrome in Tākaka, New Zealand. The airline currently operates three light aircraft from Tākaka to Wellington and Karamea, and also from Nelson to Tākaka and Karamea with connecting road shuttle services to the Abel Tasman National Park, the Heaphy Track in the Kahurangi National Park and to and from Tākaka township. Other services provided by the airline include charter flights around New Zealand flown on demand and preset scenic routes around the national parks as well as Farewell Spit.

History
Golden Bay Air originated in November 2005 as Zephair Limited, and flights began in 2006 under the name Capital Air. The name of the company was legally changed to Capital Air Bookings Ltd in September of that year, and the airline changed its name to the one currently used in May 2009.

The airline was originally based in Wellington, but moved its base of operations to Tākaka at the time of the name change in 2009.

In 2010, Golden Bay Air commissioned a global navigation satellite system (GNSS) instrument approach system at Tākaka Aerodrome.

In April 2018, Golden Bay Air ceased passenger operations temporarily as their air operator certificate issued by the Civil Aviation Authority of New Zealand had lapsed. The airline chartered flights from other airlines in order to honour bookings. The airline announced on 19 May 2018 that the re-certification procedure had been completed.

Fleet
In late 2022, the airline added a Britten-Norman BN-2 Islander to its fleet. The following aircraft are operated by the airline:

Destinations
Golden Bay Air operates scheduled services to four airports:
 Karamea (from Nelson and Tākaka)
 Nelson (from Tākaka and Karamea)
 Tākaka (hub)
 Wellington (from Tākaka)

In addition to the scheduled flights, on demand flights operate between Karamea and Motueka.

Notes

References

External links

Airlines of New Zealand
Airlines established in 2006
New Zealand companies established in 2006
Tākaka